Svelvik  is a town in Drammen municipality, Viken county. It is also a former municipality, which was a part of former Vestfold county.

The town of Svelvik was separated from the rural municipality of Strømm to become a municipality of its own in 1845. The two municipalities were merged back together on 1 January 1964.

General information

Name
The Old Norse form of the name was Sverðvík. The first element is sverð n 'sword', the last element is vík f 'cove, wick'. A neighbouring farm has the name Sverstad (Norse Sverðstaðir). The word sverð probably refers to the promontory ridge Ryggen ('the back') in Hurum: This ridge lies right opposite Svelvik and Sverstad, and is almost (like a sword) cutting the Drammensfjord in two parts.

Coat-of-arms
The coat-of-arms is from modern times.  They were granted on 4 September 1964. The arms show a gold-colored trident on a red background, as a symbol for the sea.

Geography

The narrow Svelvikstrømmen sound separates Svelvik from the municipality of Asker, and the county of Viken. This sound is served by a ferry, which has the shortest line in Norway.

The village is quite characteristic, with small winding streets and traditional, white-painted houses. Svelvik has many venues for swimming and sunbathing.

Media
The newspaper Svelviksposten is published in Svelvik.

Notable residents

Gallery of Svelvik

References

External links
 Svelvik kommune
 Svelvikportalen.no
 Detailed statistics for Svelvik kommune
 Local news from Svelviksposten
 Photographs of Svelvik 1904-1938
 Culture in Svelvik map from Kulturnett.no
 Historical archives of the current Svelvik kommune at 
 Historical archives of the former Svelvik kommune at 
 Historical archives of the former Strømm kommune at 

Municipal fact sheet from Statistics Norway

 
Cities and towns in Norway
Drammen